Manners & Physique is the fourth solo album by Adam Ant. It was released in 1990 by MCA Records.  The single "Room at the Top" peaked at number 13 in the UK and number 17 in the United States. "Rough Stuff" (US) and "Can't Set Rules About Love" (UK) were released afterwards.

The album is dedicated to Ann Marie Dollard, Ant's "Dear Friend", 1956-1988. Dollard was Ant's acting agent who was killed in a riding accident.

In 2009, the album was re-released with remastered and bonus tracks.

The album peaked at No.19 in the UK and No.57 on the Billboard 200.

Production
The album was recorded in California, and was produced by André Cymone. Ant is credited with writing or co-writing all the tracks on the album, mostly in partnership with guitarist Marco Pirroni or Cymone, who is credited with playing "Everything Else".

Ant later claimed that the album was styled after the bass heavy Minneapolis sound of which Cymone, in Ant's words, was "one of the architects".

Although the album was recorded in 1989, six of the tracks were written in 1986.  One of these, the Manners & Physique title track, features lyrics from a 1986 composition, set to new music written by Cymone. The original demo, "Doggy Style," can be heard as a bonus track on later reissues of Vive Le Rock.

Critical reception
Trouser Press called the album "confident and entertaining," writing that "walloping techno beats and monotonous funk-rock grooves occasionally dislocate the album’s pop spine, but Adam’s melodic vocals and ridiculous lyrics remain a reassuring constant." The Rolling Stone Album Guide wrote that it "traded on the skills of ex-Prince cohort Andre Cymone, whose production helped it work as a mix of British glamour-pop and Minneapolis R&B."

Track listing 
Original release

 "Room at the Top" – 4:43 (Adam Ant, Marco Pirroni, André Cymone)
 "Rough Stuff" – 4:40 (Ant, Cymone)
 "If You Keep On" – 4:16 (Ant, Kevin Rowland)
 "Manners & Physique" – 3:30 (Ant, Cymone)
 "Can't Set Rules About Love" – 4:43 (Ant, Pirroni)
 "U.S.S.A." – 4:27 (Ant)
 "Bright Lights Black Leather" – 5:22 (Ant)
 "Piccadilly" – 4:52 (Ant, Cymone)
 "Young Dumb and Full of It" – 3:32 (Ant, Pirroni)
 "Anger Inc." – 4:35 (Ant, Pirroni)

Re-release on Cherry Records
 "Room at the Top" – 4:43
 "Rough Stuff" – 4:40
 "If You Keep On" – 4:16
 "Manners & Physique" – 3:30
 "Can't Set Rules About Love" – 4:43
 "U.S.S.A." – 4:27
 "Bright Lights Black Leather" – 5:22
 "Piccadilly" – 4:52
 "Young Dumb and Full of It" – 3:32
 "Anger Inc." – 4:35
 "Bruce Lee" – 4:48
 "Room at the Top [US Remix]" – 6:50
 "Rough Stuff [7 Inch Edit Of 12 Inch]" – 4:13
 "Room at the Top [House Vocal]" – 7:25
 "Rough Stuff [12 Inch Vocal Remix]" – 6:47

Tracks 11–15 are bonus tracks from various 7" and 12" releases. Tracks 12–15 remixed by Justin Strauss.

Personnel 
 Adam Ant – vocals
 Marco Pirroni – guitars, electric bass
 André Cymone – "everything else" (keyboards, synthesizers, electric & synth bass, drums, percussion, drum programming)
 Melanie Andrews – backing vocals on "Rough Stuff" and "Young, Dumb and Full of It"

Production 
 Produced by André Cymone
 Recorded, engineered & mixed by Dan Marnien
 Assistant recording engineer: Sally Browther
 Assistant mix engineer: Ryan Dorn
 Mastered by Steve Hall
 Norman Moore – art direction, design
 Chris Cuffaro – photography

Charts

References

External links 

 

Adam Ant albums
1990 albums
MCA Records albums
Albums produced by André Cymone